"Daisy" is an eau de toilette perfume by American fashion designer Marc Jacobs, which debuted in 2007. Since 2018, it has been the readers' choice of Allure's Best of Beauty awards.

History 

Spanish perfumer Alberto Morillas of the Swiss company Firmenich has created the formulas since its inception. The fragrance is made of notes including wild berries, white violet, jasmine, and sandalwood, and is known to reflect a neutral or natural scent. Daisy has branched off many collections including Eau So Fresh, Eau So Intense, Eau So Sweet, Daisy Dream, Daisy Love, Daisy Love Daze, and Daisy Spring. For the first three years of the product, Russian model Irina Kulikova was the face of the advertisements. The first television advertisement for the perfume featured Swedish, American, and Hungarian models Frida Gustavsson, Hannah Holman, and Sophie Srej, filmed in Spain by Jacobs's frequent collaborator Juergen Teller. A commercial for Daisy "Eau So Fresh" directed by Sofia Coppola featured American model Ondria Hardin, British model Malaika Firth, British-German model Sophia Ahrens, and German model Antonia Wesseloh. Daisy Love is currently represented by American models Meghan Roche, Kaia Gerber, and Australian model Adut Akech. Gerber has also appeared in campaigns for Daisy Love "Eau So Sweet" with American model Faith Lynch and Haitian model Aube Jolicoeur; and is the face of Eau So Intense.

In contemporary times, the perfume's ethos is said to embody the cottagecore trend among young women.

References 

Products introduced in 2007
Perfumes
21st-century perfumes